Live at the Roundhouse is a live concert DVD by American dark cabaret duo The Dresden Dolls.

On November 3 and 4, 2006, The Dresden Dolls performed at London's recently restored Roundhouse venue. The shows (and resulting DVD) featured a large number of artistic performers, circus acts, gymnasts, and cabaret dancers, both as support acts and participating alongside the band during their set. The set draws from both of their studio albums, previously unreleased songs and covers.

Track listing 

 Bonus material

Performances

 "Missed Me" (with Edward Ka-Spel) – 5:24
 "Delilah" (with Lene Lovich) – 7:34

Documentary

 Documentary footage and interviews about the shows – 26:08

Personnel 

 Amanda Palmer – vocals, piano
 Brian Viglione – drums, vocals, guitar, bass
 Margaret Cho – Master of Ceremonies
 Terry Shand – executive producer
 Geoff Kempin – executive producer
 Alan Ravenscroft – producer
 Tina Korhonen – still photography
 Peter Aspden – still photography
 PixieVisionProductions – still photography
 James Robinson – still photography
 Nikki McGowan – still photography
 Mark Bennett – still photography
 Nikkie Amouyal – packaging

Live video albums
2007 live albums
2007 video albums
The Dresden Dolls albums